High Dyke is a village in County Durham, in England. It is situated a short distance to the north of Middleton-in-Teesdale.

References

Villages in County Durham